Olmeda del Rey is a municipality in Cuenca, Castile-La Mancha, Spain. It has an area of 75.44 km² and in 2017, its population was estimated at 132.

References

Municipalities in the Province of Cuenca